Eddy Polanco (born August 5, 1994) is a Dominican-American professional basketball player for Astoria Bydgoszcz of the Polish Basketball League (PLK).

College career
He played for the Southeastern Louisiana Lions, a team in the NCAA Southland Conference. As a senior, he averaged 8.8 points and 3.3 rebounds per game.

Professional career
After graduation, Polanco signed with the Leones de Santo Domingo. He subsequently joined Albacete Basket of the LEB Plata and scored 44 points in a game in October 2019.

In January 2020, he signed with Força Lleida. He averaged 8.8 points per game in six games.

On July 22, 2021, Polanco signed with Almansa of the LEB Oro.

On July 14, 2022, he has signed with Astoria Bydgoszcz of the Polish Basketball League (PLK).

References

External links
Southeastern Louisiana Lions bio

1994 births
Living people
American men's basketball players
American expatriate basketball people in Spain
Astoria Bydgoszcz players
College of Central Florida Patriots men's basketball players
Força Lleida CE players
Shooting guards
Southeastern Louisiana Lions basketball players